Fernando "Nando" Quesada Gallardo (born 5 January 1994) is a Spanish professional footballer who plays for CD Ebro as a central midfielder.

Club career
Born in Sabadell, Barcelona, Catalonia, Quesada joined FC Barcelona's youth setup in 2003, aged nine, after starting it out at CE Mercantil. He was released in 2013, and subsequently had trials at Stoke City, Liverpool and PSV Eindhoven; he also signed a four-year deal with Genoa C.F.C. shortly after, but it was declaread void after he failed a medical.

On 31 January 2014, Quesada signed a three-and-a-half-year deal with fellow Eredivisie team FC Utrecht. He made his debut in the category on 2 February, in a 1–1 home draw against AFC Ajax.

On 2 February 2015, after only making three senior appearances, Quesada was loaned to Achilles '29 in the Eerste Divisie, until June. He was recalled on 24 March, and released in September.

On 8 October 2015, free agent Quesada signed for Segunda División side UE Llagostera. On 10 July 2017, after featuring sparingly, he signed for SD Formentera in Segunda División B.

On 28 June 2018, Quesada agreed to a contract with Elche CF, newly promoted to the second division. On 16 August, however, he was loaned to Atlético Sanluqueño CF in the third level, for one year, and signed permanently for the latter club on 5 July 2019.

References

External links

Voetbal International profile 

1994 births
Living people
Sportspeople from Sabadell
Footballers from Catalonia
Spanish footballers
Association football midfielders
Eredivisie players
Eerste Divisie players
FC Utrecht players
Achilles '29 players
Segunda División players
Segunda División B players
UE Costa Brava players
SD Formentera players
Elche CF players
Atlético Sanluqueño CF players
UD Melilla footballers
CD Ebro players
Spanish expatriate footballers
Spanish expatriate sportspeople in the Netherlands
Expatriate footballers in the Netherlands
Spain youth international footballers